Port Famine was a steamboat landing and woodyard, supplying wood to the steamboats on the lower Colorado River in Sonora, Mexico, from the 1854 to the late 1870s.

Location
Port Famine was located 40 miles above Robinson's Landing and 17 miles below Gridiron.  Port Famine lay along the east bank of the river 64 miles (103 km) below what is now the Sonora - Arizona border.

References

External links
  DavidRumsey.com: "Geological Map No. 1." Prepared by J.S. Newberry, M.D. Geologist to the Expedition. — Explorations and Surveys of U.S. War Department, "Map No. 1. Rio Colorado of the West" explored by 1st Lieut. Joseph C. Ives, Topl. Engrs. under the direction of the Office of Explorations and Surveys. A.A. Humphreys, Capt. Topl. Engrs. in Charge, by 1858 order of the Hon. John B. Floyd, Secretary of War. — Drawn by Frhr. F.W.v. Egloffstein. Topographer to the Expedition. Topography by Frhr. F.W.v. Egloffstein. Ruling by Samuel Sartain. Lettering by F. Courtenay. 1858.

Former populated places in San Luis Río Colorado Municipality, Sonora
Communities in the Lower Colorado River Valley
Ports and harbours of Mexico
River ports
Steamboat transport on the Colorado River
Populated places established in 1854
1854 establishments in Mexico